The Sudbury Valley School was founded in 1968 by a community of people in Framingham, Massachusetts, United States. As of 2019, there are several schools that state that they are based on the Sudbury Model in the United States, Australia, Belgium, Canada, France, Germany, Israel, Japan and Switzerland (for details see list of Sudbury schools).

The model has three basic tenets: educational freedom, democratic governance and personal responsibility. It is a private school, attended by children from the ages of 4 to 19.

History 
Sudbury Valley School was founded in 1968 by a community of people including Daniel Greenberg, Joan Rubin, Mimsy Sadofsky and Hanna Greenberg in Framingham. Greenberg aimed to create a school system that was just, psychologically comfortable, and self-governing with real-life being the primary source of learning. The school started the summer of 1968 with 130 students enrolled in a trial summer session before the school year start in September. During the summer session, there were two notable flaws: the smorgasbord plan in offering a variety of ways of information that the students could access if they wished; and the staffing. Of the initial 130 students, about half enrolled in the school year, ages 4 to 17. The 1990s saw a spread of the Sudbury Model throughout the US and abroad and there are now many schools based on Sudbury.

Facilities
There are no traditional classrooms and no traditional classes; instead children are free to do what they wish with their time. This may or may not include formally exploring academia or speaking with staff members or other students about academic interests, as part of educating themselves.

Curriculum
The school has no required academic activities and no academic expectations for completion of one's time at the school. Students are free to spend their time as they wish.

Government
Students are given complete responsibility for their own education and the school is run by a direct democracy in which students and staff are equals. The corporation is wholly owned and operated by the School Meeting, in which each student and each elected member of the staff has one vote.

Staff

There is no tenure at Sudbury Valley School. The School Meeting, with each participant receiving one vote, hires staff, as part of its duties in running the school. Every year, in the spring, elections are held for next year's staff. School Meeting members (staff and students) may nominate people to the role of staff. The School Meeting debates the school's staff needs, and discusses each candidate in turn. There is an election with secret paper ballots which is open to all students and staff. Staff who have received more yes votes than no votes in this election are eligible to receive contracts negotiated on the floor of the School Meeting.

Alumni
Sudbury Valley School has published two studies of their alumni over the past forty years. There have, as yet, been no formal studies of graduates of other Sudbury schools, but, anecdotally, they seem to have similar results. Laura Poitras is an alumna.

Officers
Officers of the corporation are elected by the School Meeting, meeting as the corporation, at its annual meeting.
Chairperson: Ava Easton, student
Secretary: Victoria Charles, student
Treasurer: Scott Gray, staff member

See also
Sudbury school
Autodidacticism
Alternative education
Free school movement
Learning

References

External links
 

Educational institutions established in 1968
Framingham, Massachusetts
Private high schools in Massachusetts
Schools in Middlesex County, Massachusetts
Private middle schools in Massachusetts
Private elementary schools in Massachusetts
1968 establishments in Massachusetts